Saskia Natacia Walden (born 6 July 1974) is a Surinamese accountant and educator.  She served as Minister of Economic Affairs from 16 July 2020 to 18 April 2022.

Biography
Walden was born on 6 July 1974. In 1999, she obtained her bachelor's degree in accountancy from the Port of Spain campus of the Andrews University. In 2011, she obtained a Master of Business Administration from the University of Texas at Dallas.

Walden started her career as a mathematics and accounting teacher. Later, she became a corporate accountant, and worked for the Surinamese Ministry of Finance and the Ministry of Education. In 2014, she became the Secretary of the Surinamese Checkers Union. In 2020, she was working for the Surinamese insurance company Assuria, and was nominated by the Progressive Reform Party (VHP).

On 16 July 2020, Walden was appointed as Minister of Economic Affairs, Entrepreneurship, and Technological Innovation in the cabinet of Chan Santokhi. In October 2021, it was revealed that she was still the owner of nine corporations and foundations. In her defence, Walden stated that she had performed no activities since her appointment, and that ownership is not forbidden according to the Constitution of Suriname.

Walden resigned as minister on 18 April 2022, but indicated that she would remain available for future service.

References

1974 births
Living people
Surinamese politicians
Women government ministers of Suriname
Government ministers of Suriname
Surinamese educators
Andrews University alumni
University of Texas at Dallas alumni
21st-century women politicians